Stung Sen is a protected multiple use management area and wildlife sanctuary in the Kampong Thom Province of Cambodia. It is located near the south-eastern tip of the Tonlé Sap, one of three wildlife sanctuaries around the lake, including Boeng Tonlé Chhmar and Prek Toal.

Vegetation
The dominant vegetation of the Stung Sen is open deciduous dipterocarp forest, permanent and seasonal wetlands and grasslands. The forests in the region are flooded in the rainy season. In the dry season, water recedes, leaving water only in a few permanent watercourses like the Stung Sen river and its larger tributaries and in small pools. These water bodies support semi-evergreen forest and thick bamboo forests.

Birds
Stung Sen provides habitats for a number of threatened species. The sarus crane (Grus antigone) and lesser adjutant (Leptoptilos javanicus) breed here. Other globally threatened and near-threatened species like the giant ibis (Thaumatibis gigantea), white-shouldered ibis (Pseudibis davisoni), greater adjutant (Leptoptilos dubius), black-necked stork (Ephippiorhynchus asiaticus) and grey-headed fish eagle (Ichthyophaga ichthyaetus) have been recorded here. The sanctuary has been designated as a protected Ramsar site since 2018.

References

Geography of Kampong Thom province
Wildlife sanctuaries of Cambodia
Protected areas of Cambodia
Ramsar sites in Cambodia